Brandwood End is a locality in Birmingham, England, and makes up the central part of the Brandwood electoral ward. It lies within the B14 postcode and is a sub-area of Kings Heath. The area is centred on Brandwood End Cemetery.

Areas of Birmingham, West Midlands